Aiteta apriformis is a moth of the family Nolidae first described by Francis Walker in 1857. It is found in Sri Lanka.

Its larval food plants are members of the genus Terminalia.

References

Moths of Asia
Moths described in 1857
Nolidae